Following are the official winners of the national Moroccan Chess Championships from 1965 to date.

Winners (men)
{| class="sortable wikitable"
! # !! Year !! City !! Winner
|-
|	1	||	1965	||	Tétouan	||	
|-
|	2	||	1966	||	Tétouan	||	
|-
|	3	||	1968	||	Rabat	||	
|-
|	4	||	1969	||	Rabat	||	
|-
|	5	||	1970	||	Rabat	||	
|-
|	6	||	1971	||	Rabat	||	
|-
|	7	||	1972	||	Casablanca	||	
|-
|	8	||	1973	||	Rabat	||	
|-
|	9	||	1975	||	Rabat	||	
|-
|	10	||	1976	||	Tétouan	||	
|-
|	11	||	1978	||	Tétouan	||	
|-
|	12	||	1980	||	Tétouan	||	
|-
|	13	||	1981	||	Tétouan	||	
|-
|	14	||	1982	||	Casa	||	
|-
|	15	||	1984	||	Chefchaouen	||	
|-
|	16	||	1985	||	Marrakech	||	
|-
|	17	||	1986	||	Casablanca	||	
|-
|	18	||	1987	||	Casablanca	||	
|-
|	19	||	1988	||	Rabat	||	
|-
|	20	||	1989	||	Casablanca	||	
|-
|	21	||	1990	||	Casablanca	||	
|-
|	22	||	1992	||	El Jadida	||	
|-
|	23	||	1993	||	Casablanca	||	
|-
|	24	||	1994	||	Casablanca	||	
|-
|	25	||	1995	||	Casablanca	||	
|-
|	26	||	1996	||	Meknès	||	
|-
|	27	||	1997	||	Tanger	||	
|-
|	28	||	1998	||	Casablanca	||	
|-
|	29	||	1999	||	Casablanca	||	
|-
|	30	||	2000	||	Casablanca	||	
|-
|	31	||	2001	||	Casablanca	||	
|-
|	32	||	2002	||	Casablanca	||	
|-
|	33	||	2003	||	Marrakech	||	
|-
|	34	||	2004	||	Mohammedia	||	
|-
|	35	||	2005	||	Tétouan	||	
|-
|	36	||	2006	||	Marrakech	||	
|-
|	37	||	2013	||	Casablanca	||	
|-
|	38	||	2015	||	Tétouan	||	
|-
|	39	||	2016	||	Rabat	|| 
|}

Winners (women)
{| class="sortable wikitable"
! # !! Year !! Winner
|-
|	1	||	1983	||	
|-
|	2	||	1984	||	
|-
|	3	||	1985	||	
|-
|	4	||	1986	||	
|-
|	5	||	1989	||	
|-
|	6	||	1991	||	
|-
|	7	||	1992	||	
|-
|	8	||	1993	||	
|-
|	9	||	1994	||	
|-
|	10	||	1995	||	
|-
|	11	||	1996	||	
|-
|	12	||	2000	||	
|-
|	13	||	2001	||	
|-
|	14	||	2002	||	
|-
|	16	||	2004	||	
|-
|	17	||	2005	||	
|-
|	18	||	2006	||	
|-
|		19||	2013	||	
|-
|		20||	2015	||	
|-
|		21||	2016	||	
|}

References

External links
 List of winners from maroc-echecs.com: 
 Details of the 2006 edition:  (in French)

Chess national championships
Women's chess national championships
Championship